Grudge may refer to:

Resentment

Arts

Film
Ju-On (franchise), aka The Grudge, a Japanese-American film franchise
Ju-On: The Grudge, a 2002 Japanese horror film
The Grudge (film series), an American horror film series
The Grudge, an American horror film
The Grudge (2020 film), formerly Grudge, an American horror film
Grudge (2021 film), a Turkish thriller film

Music
The Grudge (album), a 2004 album by Mortiis
"The Grudge" (song), a song by Tool
"Grudges," a 2017 song by Paramore from the album After Laughter

Other uses
Project Grudge, a project by the U.S. Air Force to investigate unidentified flying objects (UFOs)
Al Ba'sa or The Grudge, a spite house in Beirut
Grudge, a character in Making Fiends

See also

 Ressentiment